Beloved/Friend (Catalan: Amic/Amat) is a 1999 film directed by Ventura Pons based on a book by Josep Maria Benet i Jornet, Testament.

Synopsis
A dying, homosexual Middle Ages literature teacher is deciding who should inherit his loved possession; a  novel "Blanquerna", written by Ramon Llull.

References

External links

From Stage to Screen: Amic/Amat, Published by Society of Spanish & Spanish-American Studies, Vol. 26, No. 1, Teatro y Cine: La Búsqueda de Nuevos Lenguajes Expresivos (2001)
Timeline of Catalan Literature, includes information about Josep M. Benet i Jornet

1999 films
1999 drama films
Spanish LGBT-related films
Catalan-language films
Films set in Barcelona
Films directed by Ventura Pons
Gay-related films
1999 LGBT-related films
Spanish drama films
1990s Spanish films